Margaret Gibson McDowall (born 10 January 1936 in Kilmarnock, Scotland), is a female retired competitive swimmer who represented Scotland.

Swimming career
McDowall was educated at Kilmarnock Academy and was a member of the Scottish Swimming Team from the age of 14. Unusually she practiced in the local municipal swimming baths in Kilmarnock rather than any purpose built training facility.

She was a member of the three-woman relay team at the 1954 Commonwealth games in Vancouver, British Columbia, Canada and at the ASA National British Championships she won the 110 yards backstroke title four times (1950, 1951, 1952, 1953).

References

External links
sports-reference profile

British Olympic Association athlete profile

Living people
Sportspeople from Kilmarnock
Olympic swimmers of Great Britain
Scottish female swimmers
Swimmers at the 1952 Summer Olympics
Swimmers at the 1954 British Empire and Commonwealth Games
Commonwealth Games gold medallists for Scotland
1936 births
Commonwealth Games medallists in swimming
Medallists at the 1954 British Empire and Commonwealth Games